Tsvetelin is a Bulgarian masculine given name, its feminine counterpart is Tsvetelina. It may refer to
Tsvetelin Chunchukov (born 1994), Bulgarian footballer 
Tsvetelin Radev (born 1988), Bulgarian footballer 
Tsvetelin Ralchovski (born 1981), Bulgarian footballer
Tsvetelin Tonev (born 1992), Bulgarian footballer
Tsvetelina Abrasheva (born 1977), Bulgarian figure skater 
Tsvetelina Kirilova (born 1977), Bulgarian runner
Tsvetelina Naydenova (born 1994), Bulgarian rhythmic gymnast
Tsvetelina Nikolova (born 1990), Bulgarian volleyball player
Tsvetelina Stoyanova (born 1994), Bulgarian rhythmic gymnast
Tsvetelina Zarkova (born 1986), Bulgarian volleyball player

Bulgarian masculine given names